Aethes kindermanniana is a species of moth of the family Tortricidae. It was described by Treitschke in 1830. It is found on Sardinia and in Denmark, Germany, France, Spain, Italy, Switzerland, Austria, the Czech Republic, Slovakia, Poland, Hungary, Romania, Norway, Sweden, Finland, the Baltic region, Ukraine, Russia. and Asia Minor. It has also been recorded from North America.

Adults are on wing in March and from May to August.

The larvae feed on Artemisia campestris, Chrysanthemum species and Tanacetum corymbosum. Larvae can be found nearly year round.

References

kindermanniana
Moths described in 1830
Moths of Europe
Moths of Asia
Taxa named by Georg Friedrich Treitschke